Dr. Anil Sukhdevrao Bonde is a member of the Parliament of India representing Maharashtra in the Rajya Sabha, the upper house of the Indian Parliament. He also served as a member of the 13th Maharashtra Legislative Assembly. From Morshi Assembly Constituency. He belongs to the Bharatiya Janata Party Bonde's victory was with the largest margin in his Amravati district.

Bonde was the sitting MLA, he was an independent MLA in 2009 to 2014.

References

Maharashtra MLAs 2014–2019
Maharashtra MLAs 2009–2014
People from Amravati district
Independent politicians in India
Living people
Marathi politicians
Bharatiya Janata Party politicians from Maharashtra
1960 births